Addepur is a village in the Punjab province of Pakistan. It is located at 30°49'0N 73°44'0E with an altitude of 167 metres (551 feet).

References

Populated places in Sahiwal District